The following lists events that happened in 1954 in Iceland.

Incumbents
President – Ásgeir Ásgeirsson
Prime Minister – Ólafur Thors

Events

Births

23 January – Guðný Halldórsdóttir, film director and screenwriter
12 May – Friðrik Þór Friðriksson, film director
18 June – Tinna Gunnlaugsdóttir, actress
8 August – Finnur Ingólfsson, politician.
18 September – Einar Már Guðmundsson, poet and novelist
11 December – Guðlaugur Kristinn Óttarsson, musician
31 December – Ingibjörg Sólrún Gísladóttir, politician

Deaths

18 October – Einar Jónsson, sculptor (b. 1874)

References

 
1950s in Iceland
Iceland
Iceland
Years of the 20th century in Iceland